Picture Peak is a 13,140+ foot (4,001+ meter) mountain summit located one mile east of the crest of the Sierra Nevada mountain range in Inyo County in northern California, United States. It is situated in the John Muir Wilderness, on land managed by Inyo National Forest. The first ascent of the summit was made July 1967, by Gary Colliver and Steve Thompson via the northeast face. This mountain's name has not been officially adopted by the U.S. Board on Geographic Names.

Climate
According to the Köppen climate classification system, Picture Peak is located in an alpine climate zone. Most weather fronts originate in the Pacific Ocean, and travel east toward the Sierra Nevada mountains. As fronts approach, they are forced upward by the peaks, causing them to drop their moisture in the form of rain or snowfall onto the range (orographic lift). Precipitation runoff from this mountain drains into headwaters of the South Fork Bishop Creek.

Climbing
Established climbing routes on Picture Peak:

 Southwest Gully – 
 Northeast Face – class 5.9
 Northeast Buttress – class 5.10b

Gallery

See also

References

External links
 Picture Peak Rock Climbing: Mountainproject.com

Inyo National Forest
Mountains of Inyo County, California
Mountains of the John Muir Wilderness
North American 4000 m summits
Mountains of Northern California
Sierra Nevada (United States)